The Devil's advocate was an official in the Catholic Church who would attempt to prove a candidate for canonization to not be a saint, or by extension, a figure of speech for someone who takes a position they do not necessarily agree with or runs counter to their or others interests for the sake of debate or to explore the thought further, possibly with regards to demonstrated impartiality.

Devil's Advocate may also refer to:

Books
 The Devil's Advocate, a 1990 novel by Andrew Neiderman
 The Devil's Advocate (1997 film), a 1997 film, based on the Neiderman novel, starring Keanu Reeves and Al Pacino
 The Devil's Advocate, a musical stage adaptation, whose libretto is written by Andrew Neiderman
 The Devil's Advocate, a 1952 novel by Taylor Caldwell
 The Devil's Advocate (West novel), a 1959 novel by Morris West
 The Devil's Advocate (1977 film), a West German film adaptation of the Morris West novel; original title "Des Teufels Advokat" but shot in English
 Devil's Advocate, a 2000 biography by John Humphrys
 The Joker: Devil's Advocate, a 1996 comic book written by Chuck Dixon and drawn by Graham Nolan
 Devil's Advocate, a 1928 book by James George Frazer
 John Mortimer: The Devil's Advocate - The Unauthorised Biography, a 2005 biography by Graham Lord

People
Giovanni Di Stefano (born 1955), British-Italian faux lawyer, has been nicknamed "The Devil's Advocate" for his involvement in high-profile criminal cases
Jacques Vergès (1925–2013), French attorney most famous for representing Klaus Barbie, "the Butcher of Lyon"

In television and film
 The Devil's Advocate (1997 film), a 1997 film, based on the Neiderman novel, starring Keanu Reeves and Al Pacino
 Devil's Advocate (1995 film), a British television film starring Alice Krige
 Devil's Advocate (TV series), a Dutch reality television series
 Devil's Advocate, a fictional pinball game appearing in "Insane Clown Poppy", an episode of The Simpsons
 The Devil's Advocates, a fictional motorcycle gang appearing in the film Nam's Angels
 Devil's Advocate, a chapter of the BBC documentary series Notorious about British fraudster Giovanni Di Stefano

Music
 "The Devil's Advocate", a 2013 song by Christopher Lee, on Charlemagne: The Omens of Death

See also
 The Advocate's Devil, a 1994 novel by Alan Dershowitz
 A Devil's Chaplain, a book of writings by Richard Dawkins
 Robert Taylor (Radical), a man known as "The Devil's Chaplain"
 The Devil's Chaplain, a 1929 film featuring Boris Karloff